Other People's Songs is a cover album by Erasure.

The album was originally conceived as a solo project for singer Andy Bell.  Once Vince Clarke, the other member of Erasure, became involved, it was released as Erasure's tenth studio album.  The tracks were handpicked by Clarke and Bell as ones that influenced them as musicians.  It was released in the UK and the US by Mute Records in 2003, and was a Top 20 success in their home country and in Germany.

Other People's Songs gave Erasure their first Top 10 on the UK singles chart in nine years with "Solsbury Hill". The album was produced by Erasure with Gareth Jones and Dave Bascombe.  Because of Bell's resistance to remaking the classic "Video Killed the Radio Star", the verses are "sung" synthetically by a computer.

Track listing
 "Solsbury Hill" (Peter Gabriel) (originally by Peter Gabriel) – 4:20
 "Everybody's Got to Learn Sometime" (James Warren) (originally by The Korgis) – 3:20
 "Make Me Smile (Come Up and See Me)" (Steve Harley) (originally by Steve Harley & Cockney Rebel) – 3:56
 "Everyday" (Norman Petty/Buddy Holly) (originally by Buddy Holly) – 1:59
 "When Will I See You Again" (Gamble and Huff) (originally by The Three Degrees) – 2:58
 "Walking in the Rain" (Barry Mann/Cynthia Weil/Phil Spector) (originally by The Ronettes) – 2:47
 "True Love Ways" (Holly/Petty) (originally by Buddy Holly) – 3:06
 "Ebb Tide" (Robert Maxwell/Carl Sigman) (originally by Frank Chacksfield and subsequently recorded by The Righteous Brothers) – 3:06
 "Can't Help Falling in Love" (George David Weiss/Hugo & Luigi) (originally by Elvis Presley) – 3:27
 "You've Lost That Lovin' Feelin'" (Mann/Weil/Spector) (originally by The Righteous Brothers) – 3:58
 "Goodnight" (Cliff Eberhardt) (originally by Cliff Eberhardt) – 4:08
 "Video Killed the Radio Star" (Geoff Downes/Trevor Horn/Bruce Woolley) (originally by The Buggles) – 3:49

2016 "Erasure 30" 30th anniversary BMG reissue LP
Subsequent to their acquisition of Erasure's back catalog, and in anticipation of the band's 30th anniversary, BMG commissioned reissues of all previously released UK editions of Erasure albums up to and including 2007's Light at the End of the World. All titles were pressed and distributed by Play It Again Sam on 180-gram vinyl and shrinkwrapped with a custom anniversary sticker.

Charts

References

Erasure albums
2003 albums
Mute Records albums
Covers albums
Albums produced by Gareth Jones (music producer)